Big Creek Township is a township in Russell County, Kansas, United States. As of the 2010 United States Census, it had a population of 479.

Geography
The township lies in the Smoky Hills region of the Great Plains. Big Creek, a tributary of the Smoky Hill River and the township's namesake, flows windingly east through the southern part of the township. Walker Creek, a tributary of Big Creek, runs southeast through the southern half of the township to its confluence with Big Creek. Another tributary of the Smoky Hill, Fossil Creek, has its source in east-central Big Creek Township. Salt Creek, a tributary of the Saline River, flows east through the northern part of the township.

Located in west-central Russell County, it includes the city of Gorham, which is located in the west-central part of the township, and it borders Paradise Township to the north, Russell and Grant Townships to the east, Lincoln Township to the southeast, Winterset Township to the south, and Ellis County's Victoria and Herzog Townships to the west.

Demographics

As of the 2010 census, there were 479 people, 211 households, and 149 families residing in the township. The racial makeup of the township was 99.2% White, 0.2% Native American, and 0.6% from two or more races. Hispanic or Latino of any race were 0.2% of the population.

There were 211 households, out of which 26.5% had children under the age of 18 living with them, 58.8% were married couples living together, 3.3% had a male householder with no wife present, 8.5% had a female householder with no husband present, and 29.4% were non-families. 27.0% of all households were made up of individuals, and 9.4% had someone living alone who was 65 years of age or older. The average household size was 2.27, and the average family size was 2.70.

In the township, the population was spread out, with 22.1% under the age of 18, 5.8% from 18 to 24, 25.3% from 25 to 44, 30.3% from 45 to 64, and 16.5% who were 65 years of age or older. The median age was 41.5 years. For every 100 females, there were 100.4 males. For every 100 females age 18 and over, there were 97.4 males age 18 and over.

Education
Big Creek Township lies within unified school district 407, Russell County Schools.

Transportation
Interstate 70 and U.S. Route 40 run concurrently east–west through Big Creek Township, interchanging with 176th Street, a paved north–south county road, one mile south of Gorham. The former alignment of U.S. 40 runs broadly east–west through Gorham and the township, connecting to a network of mostly unpaved county roads laid out in a rough grid pattern. Another paved north–south road, Gorham-Fairport Road, runs north from old U.S. 40 one mile east of Gorham.

The Kansas Pacific line of the Union Pacific Railroad runs through the township parallel to the old alignment of U.S. 40.

References

Townships in Russell County, Kansas
Townships in Kansas